Florence Small Gaynor (October 29, 1920 – September 16, 1993) was the first black woman to head a major teaching hospital in the United States.

Background 
Born in Jersey City, New Jersey, she graduated Lincoln High School at the age of 15 and applied to Jersey City Medical Center to study nursing, but was rejected as they did not admit Blacks, instead studying nursing at Lincoln Hospital, graduating in 1946 and began working at Queens General Hospital. Gaynor then worked for the New York City's Health Department and Francis Delafield Hospital.

Gaynor studied both her Bachelor of Science in Nursing and then Master of Science in public health at New York University, followed by the University of Oslo in 1965.

Gaynor began working in hospital administration at Lincoln Hospital and became assistant administrator in 1970. In 1971 she was selected to become the executive director of Sydenham Hospital, making her the first black woman to head a major teaching hospital in the United States. In 1972 she accepted a position as executive director of Martland Hospital in Newark, and then became a director at Meharry Medical College in Nashville from 1976 to 1980, followed by a director position at the West Philadelphia Community Mental Health Consortium in Philadelphia from 1980 to 1984.

Gaynor died of a sudden brain hemorrhage at the age of 72.

References 

1920 births
1993 deaths
Lincoln High School (New Jersey) alumni
New York University alumni
University of Oslo alumni
Meharry Medical College
American women nurses
African-American nurses
20th-century American women scientists
21st-century American women scientists
People from Jersey City, New Jersey
Scientists from New Jersey
20th-century African-American women
20th-century African-American scientists
21st-century African-American women
21st-century African-American scientists